The castle of Bouka (from the Italian word bocca) was the first major Ottoman fortification of Preveza, in northwestern Greece. It was constructed by the Ottomans in 1478, in order to control the straits of the Ambracian Gulf. In 1701, the Venetians blew the castle up before they handed Preveza over to the Ottomans, according to the terms of the Treaty of Karlowitz.

The castle of Bouka was standing upon the site which today is called "Paliosaraga" (Παλιοσάραγα, "Old Seraglio"). The summer seraglio of Ali Pasha of Yannina was built on the castle's remains, during the early 1810s. After Preveza's capture by the Greek Army in 1912, an army supply unit was based on the site of the castle. Today, there are very few remains of the castle of Bouka, despite the fact that the site has generally not been built up.

History
The castle was built by the Ottomans in 1478, fifteen years after their definite occupation of the region of Preveza and Riniassa. The date of the castle's construction is also mentioned in the Short Chronicle number 71.7: ἔκτισεν τὴν Πρέβεζαν ἐπὶ ἔτους ‚ςϡπς΄, "he fortified Preveza in the year 6986 [Anno Mundi]". The year 6986 Anno Mundi corresponds to 1.9.1477-31.8.1478 in the Gregorian calendar. The construction of the castle at the mouth of the Ambracian Gulf was immediately recognized by Leonardo III Tocco, Count of Cephalonia, in a manuscript letter written on 31 March 1478, as a danger for the Republic of Venice. Because of this, he sent his relative, Bogordo di Tocco, to Venice in order to seek its assistance. In this letter the castle is mentioned as "castello ala bucca delo gulfo" ("castle at the mouth/entrance of the gulf"). During the first Ottoman years, the castle became known as Preveze kalesi, and eventually gave its name to the small human settlement which was formed north of the castle. The first time that the name Preveza has been recorded on a clearly dated document is in a letter by f. Leonardo Michiel of Corfu, in 1481.

The castle was presumably strengthened by the Ottomans in 1486-87, as well as in 1495 in order to ward off the imminent danger from the West, due to the conquering plans of the French king Charles VIII, which, however, were eventually abandoned.
The castle was also improved in 1530, in 1552 during the reign of Suleiman the Magnificent, and by the Venetians, after they conquered Preveza, in 1684.

When the great Ottoman traveler Evliya Çelebi visited Preveza, around 1670, he described Bouka as a castle guarded by a garrison of 250 soldiers, with narrow streets, and about 100 small houses without gardens, as well as a mosque constructed by Sultan Süleyman I (r. 1520-66). Outside the walls of the castle were 300 large houses with gardens and a bazaar with 100 shops.

The castle was demolished by the Venetians in 1701, before surrendering the area to the Ottomans, in accordance to the provisions of the Treaty of Karlowitz and other bilateral agreements. Immediately after the demolition of the castle of Bouka and the handing over of Preveza, the Ottomans started constructing a large castle in order to defend the town and the straits of the Ambracian Gulf.

References

Sources
Nikos D. Karabelas, 2010: The castle of Bouka (1478-1701). Fortified Preveza through sources, in: Preveza B. Proceedings of the Second International Symposium for the History and Culture of Preveza (16–20 September 2009), Preveza, 2010, vol. I, pp. 395–433; Editors: Marina Vrelli-Zachou, Christos Stavrakos; Publishers: University of Ioannina, Municipality of Preveza, Actia Nicopolis Foundation;  / 
Nikos D. Karabelas, 2012: Ottoman Fortifications in Preveza in 1702. The First Phase of the Castle of İç Kale, Journal of the Center for Ottoman Studies, Ankara University (OTAM) 32, Ankara, 2012, pp. 47–66
Nikos D. Karabelas, 2015: The Ottoman conquest of Preveza and its first castle, Proceedings of the XVIth Congress of Turkish History (20–24 September 2010), Ankara, 2015, vol. 4.2, pp. 967–998; Publisher: Türk Tarih Kurumu;  / 
Nikos D. Karabelas, 2017: The fortifications of a strategic Passage, Prevezanika Chronika 53-54, Preveza, 2017, pp. 99–140

Gallery

Preveza
Ottoman fortifications in Epirus (region)
1478 establishments in the Ottoman Empire
15th-century fortifications in Greece
Ruined castles in Greece
Castles in Preveza